Sidney Toler (born Hooper G. Toler Jr., April 28, 1874 – February 12, 1947) was an American actor, playwright, and theatre director. The second European-American actor to play the role of Charlie Chan on screen, he is best remembered for his portrayal of the Chinese-American detective in 22 films made between 1938 and 1946. Before becoming Chan, Toler played supporting roles in 50 motion pictures, and was a highly regarded comic actor on the Broadway stage.

Early life and career

Hooper G. Toler Jr., who was called Sidney Toler from childhood, was born April 28, 1874, in Warrensburg, Missouri. He showed an early interest in the theater, acting in an amateur production of Tom Sawyer at the age of seven. He left the University of Kansas and became a professional actor in 1892, playing the heavy in a performance of a melodrama called The Master Man in Kansas City. In 1894, he joined the Corse Payton company and toured for four years. His success in leading roles at the Lee Avenue Academy in Brooklyn brought an invitation to join the company of Julia Marlowe. He toured with her for two years, playing the Duke of Buckingham in When Knighthood Was in Flower.

In Brooklyn, Toler played leads with the Columbia Theatre Stock Company and sang baritone with the Orpheum Theatre's operatic stock company. In 1903, he made his Broadway debut in the musical comedy, The Office Boy.

Over the next nine years, Toler had his own theatre companies in Portland, Maine, and Halifax, Nova Scotia—at one point having 12 stock companies on the road. He began a prolific career as a playwright, writing The Belle of Richmond, The Dancing Master, The House on the Sands, and more than 70 other plays. One particular success was a war play called The Man They Left Behind, which was presented by 67 companies in a period of three months and by 18 different companies in a single week.

In 1921, Paramount Pictures released two films based on Toler's plays: The Bait, adapted from The Tiger Lady, and A Heart to Let, based on Agatha's Aunt, which Toler adapted from a novel by Harriet Lummis Smith. Three of his plays reached Broadway: The Golden Days (1921), which starred Helen Hayes, The Exile (1923), and Ritzy (1930).

Toler earned fame as an actor on the Broadway stage, working for David Belasco for 14 years. He was best known for his comedy roles, from the detective-butler in On the Hiring Line (1919)—a performance that The New York Times called "one of the comedy high spots of the week"—to Cool Kelly the iceman in It's a Wise Child (1929–30).

In 1929, Toler made his first film, Madame X, and in 1931, after the Boston run of It's a Wise Child, he moved to Hollywood. He played supporting roles in films, including White Shoulders (1931), Tom Brown of Culver (1932), Blonde Venus (1932), The Phantom President (1932), The World Changes (1933), Spitfire (1934), Operator 13 (1934), The Call of the Wild (1935), Three Godfathers (1936), The Gorgeous Hussy (1936), Double Wedding (1937), The Mysterious Rider (1938), and Law of the Pampas (1939).

Charlie Chan series

Following the death of Warner Oland, Twentieth Century-Fox began the search for a new Charlie Chan. Thirty-four actors were tested before the studio decided on Toler. Twentieth Century-Fox announced its choice on October 16, 1938, and filming began October 24 on Charlie Chan in Honolulu, which had been originally scripted for Warner Oland and Keye Luke. 

Toler's interpretation of the Chinese detective in Charlie Chan in Honolulu was very well received. Box Office Digest: "Charlie Chan is in safe hands. Charlie will go marching on to cheerful tunes in the person of Sidney Toler. It isn't an imitation Warner Oland characterization that Toler delivers, but it is a thoroughly satisfying, neatly shaded Charlie Chan." Independent Exhibitors Film Bulletin: "As for Toler, he does a superlative job. He has sensibly formulated his own characterization, a lighter, more affable and less formal Charlie Chan. We think audiences will accept him." Motion Picture Herald: "[The preview was] attended by top-ranking executives, the most sought-after reviewers and commentators, and invited guests... quite a few of these strangers to Chan went into ecstasies."

Besides Toler, another change was made in the series. Sen Yung, as Number Two Son Jimmy, replaced Keye Luke, who had played Number One Son Lee. Toler's Chan, rather than merely mimicking the character that Oland had portrayed, had a somewhat sharper edge that was well suited for the rapid changes of the times, both political and cultural. When needed, Charlie Chan now displayed overt sarcasm, usually toward his son Jimmy.

Through four years and 11 films, Toler played Charlie Chan for Twentieth Century-Fox. In 1942, though, following the completion of Castle in the Desert, Fox concluded the series. The wartime collapse of the international film market may have been a factor, but the main reason was that Fox was curtailing virtually all of its low-budget series. Fox's other "B" series — Jane Withers, Michael Shayne, and The Cisco Kid — also ended that year. Only Laurel and Hardy remained in Fox's "B" unit, until it shut down at the end of 1944.

With Fox no longer producing Chan films, Toler bought the screen rights to the Charlie Chan character from Eleanor Biggers Cole, the widow of Chan's creator, Earl Derr Biggers. Toler had hoped that if he could find someone to produce new Charlie Chan films, starring himself, Fox would distribute them. Fox declined, having already dropped the series, but Toler sold the idea to Monogram Pictures, a lower-budget film studio. Philip N. Krasne, a Hollywood lawyer who invested in film productions, partnered with James S. Burkett to produce the Monogram Chans.

With the release of Charlie Chan in the Secret Service (1944), the effects of a more limited budget were apparent. Production values were no match for those of Fox; Monogram's budgets were typically about 40% of what Fox's had been. In fairness to Monogram, the films did gradually improve, with The Chinese Cat, The Shanghai Cobra, and Dark Alibi often cited as favorites by fans. Cast changes were again made: Sen Yung left Hollywood to serve in the U.S. Army Air Forces during World War II, ultimately earning the rank of captain. Yung's Number Two Son Jimmy was replaced by Benson Fong as Number Three Son Tommy (and once by Number Four Son Edwin Luke, real-life brother of Number One Son Keye Luke). Mantan Moreland played the ever-present and popular Birmingham Brown, who brought comedy relief (and African American audiences) to the series. Monogram's Charlie Chan films were profitable and successful; they boasted tricky screenplays with many surprise culprits and murder devices, and frequent appearances by "name" character actors.

Later years
After 1943 Sidney Toler was playing Charlie Chan exclusively, except for a single instance in 1945. The Fred Allen comedy It's in the Bag! cast Toler as a plainclothes detective who speaks without prepositions -- like Charlie Chan.

By the end of 1946, age and illness were affecting Toler. Diagnosed with cancer, the 72-year-old Toler was so ill during the filming of Dangerous Money (1946) and Shadows Over Chinatown (1946) that he could hardly walk. Monogram hired Toler's original foil, "Number Two Son" Sen Yung (now billed as Victor Sen Young) for Toler's last three films, quite probably to ease the burden on Toler. According to Mantan Moreland, Toler gallantly refused to leave the series: "Mr. Toler couldn't stand for very long and had to rest a lot. I told him he should be in a hospital. And he said to me, 'Manny, if I quit the picture I'll put all these people out of work.'" Toler mustered enough strength to complete his last film, The Trap, which was filmed in July–August 1946, and released in November that same year. (Young and Moreland relieved Toler of much of the action in The Trap). Toler's Monogram output matched his Fox output: 11 films for each studio.

Personal life

On August 29, 1906, Toler married actress Vivian Marston (born Josephine Gasper) of Boston, Massachusetts. She died in Hollywood on October 7, 1943, after an illness of seven months. Four weeks later, he married sculptor Vera Tattersall Orkow, a British-born actress credited as Viva Tattersall when Toler and she performed together and co-wrote the plays Dress Parade (1929) and Ritzy (1930). Their marriage lasted until Toler's death.

Sidney Toler died on February 12, 1947, at his home in Los Angeles from intestinal cancer. He is buried at Highland Cemetery, Wichita, Sedgwick County, Kansas, USA. Monogram continued the Charlie Chan series with actor Roland Winters, who appeared in six Chan features.

Filmography

References

External links

 
 
 

1874 births
1947 deaths
People from Warrensburg, Missouri
Male actors from Missouri
American dramatists and playwrights
American male film actors
American male silent film actors
19th-century American male actors
American male stage actors
American theatre directors
Deaths from colorectal cancer
Deaths from cancer in California
Writers from Missouri
20th-century American male actors
University of Kansas alumni